Andre Johnson (born 29 December 1970), better known by his stage name Jah Mason, also known as Fire Mason, is a reggae singer/deejay from Jamaica, active as a recording artist since 1991.

Biography
Jah Mason was born in Jamaica's Manchester Parish, and grew up in a Christian family. During his childhood, he was nicknamed Perry Mason for his ability to resolve disputes, and it was under this name that his debut single "Selassie I Call We" was released in 1991 on Junior Reid's JR record label. In 1995 he joined the Bobo Ashanti order of the Rastafari movement, and began performing and recording as Jah Mason after linking up with the David House group. He had hits in Jamaica with "My Princess Gone" and "Lion Look", and also made guest appearances on singles by his friend Jah Cure. His first albums came in 2002 with Keep Your Joy and Working So Hard. Since then he has released albums at a rate of more than one a year, including Wheat and Tears and Princess Gone...The Saga Bed, both released in 2006 on Greensleeves Records and VP Records respectively, and the latter distributed by Warners. The Jamaica Gleaner, reviewing Wheat and Tears, commented on a lack of originality in Jah Mason's work but went on to say "clichés notwithstanding, the album is musical, and for hardcore reggae fans, the disc should provide enough of a vibe to chill with." David Jeffries of AllMusic described him as "an effortlessly agile artist able to communicate love, pathos, revolution, spirituality, and even sensuality on equal terms."

The song Mi Chalwa, recorded and mixed by Soundism's Vladi Vargas, was included on Greensleeves' compilation album The Biggest Reggae One Drop Anthems 2005, which Jamaica Observer gave accolades and called a "must-have collection".

In November 2015 he released his 19th studio album, Love & Wisdom.

Discography
Keep Your Joy (2002), Ghetto Technology
Working So Hard (2002), KJ
Unlimited (2003), Reggae Vibes
Never Give Up (2003), On the Corner
Surprise Dem (2004), Vikingsd
Most Royal (2004), Jah Warrior
Rise (2005), On the Corner
Princess Gone...The Saga Bed (2006), VP
Wheat and Tears (2006), Greensleeves
Life Is Just a Journey (2007), Maximum Sound/Corner Shop
The Pow Pow Triology (2008), Pow Pow – with Anthony B and Turbulence
No Matter the Time (2008), Vikings
Ruff & Tuff Riddim (2008), Pow Pow
Work Off Selection (2008), IrieVibrations
Keep Ya Head Up (2010), Rastar
Love & Wisdom (2015), New Creation Records

References

1970 births
People from Manchester Parish
Jamaican reggae singers
Living people
Jamaican Rastafarians
Jamaican former Christians
Converts to the Rastafari movement